André Almuró (3 June 1927 – 17 June 2009) was a French radio producer, composer, and film director.

Early years 

Almuró was born in Paris in 1927 and studied piano from an early age. In 1946, influenced by Surrealism and René Daumal, he founded a literary journal titled Les Cahiers Sensationnistes.

In 1947, he joined Pierre Schaeffer's Club d'Essai on RTF (Radio Télévision Française) as a radio producer. During the 1950s, he produced many radio plays based on French writers, with a preference for Surrealists like André Breton, René Char, Jean Cocteau, Antonin Artaud, Julien Gracq.

1950s 

Almuró used increasingly difficult and provocative texts for his radio plays, like Jean Genet's homoerotic poem Le Condamné à Mort, for which Almuró created electroacoustic music in 1952, or Antonin Artaud's Van Gogh, Le Suicidé De La Société in 1958, a text written 1947, the same year as Pour en Finir avec le Jugement de Dieu [To Have Done With the Judgment of God], written for radio but withheld from broadcast by directors in 1948.

In 1957, his meeting with 15-year-old Pierre Clémenti influenced Almuró to start recording Clémenti's poetry readings and make him his assistant. Clémenti, born 1942, later became actor and film director, collaborating with Almuró on several films.

When Schaeffer founded his Groupe de Recherches Musicales in 1958, Almuró joined as a member for several years, but soon launched his own, independent recording studio in the early 1960s. Here he produced incidental music and collaborations with other artists, like singer Colette Magny, with whom he published two LPs, Avec, 1966 and Bura Bura, 1967.

Teacher and filmmaker 

In 1973, Almuró became a teacher at Paris' Sorbonne University (UFR d’Arts Plastiques, Faculté Paris I Sorbonne). Other teachers included writer Dominique Noguez and contemporary artist Michel Journiac. Students included film maker Stéphane Marti and musicians Jean-Luc Guionnet and Eric Cordier.

In 1976, he created a live performance titled Partition with French contemporary artist Ange Leccia, and founded the Son-Images-Corps performance group with students. His opera Close Up was premiered in Poitiers, France.

In 1978 he directed his first film, Cortège, with music by electroacoustic music composer and Almuró student, Philippe Jubard. Almuró's cinema is overtly homoerotic and has been described as "un cinéma d’orgasme et de désir entre deux hommes" (pleasure and desire between two men) by French film director Christian Lebrat. From this date, Almuró directed more than 30 films, including Alliage, 1985, Point Vélique, 1986 and Corps Intérieur, 1988.

Selected works

Radio plays
1952 Le Condamné à Mort, by Jean Genet
1955 Nadja Etoilée, after André Breton with Maria Casarès and Roger Blin
1958 Van Gogh, Le Suicidé De La Société, by Antonin Artaud

Electroacoustic music
 1958 Croquis aux Percussions
 1958 Erostrauss
 1966 Phonolithe
 1966 Poésie de Cruauté LP (EMZ 13514)
 1966 Avec, LP with Colette Magny
 1967 Bura Bura, LP with Colette Magny
 1967 Va-Et-Vient
 1968 Mantra 107
 1969 Prolégosphère
 1978 Terrae Incognitae (oratorio)
 1979 Boomerang, Prelude
 1991 Le Troisième Oeil

Films
 1958 Les Enfants de Misère, with Pierre Clémenti
 1959 Le Deuxième Monde, with Pierre Clémenti
 1960 Poèmes, with Pierre Clémenti
 1973 Pièce de Musique, with Pierre Clémenti
 1978 Cortège, music by Philippe Jubard
 1985 Alliage
 1986 Point Vélique
 1987 L'inopiné
 1988 Corps intérieur
 1989 Le Troisième Oeil
 1990 Clones, with Yves Pélissier
 1991 Continuum, with Denis Le Rue
 1992 Rumeur, with Jean-Luc Guionnet
 1994 Littérale, with Jean-Luc Guionnet
 1996 Tropes, with Jean-Luc Guionnet
 1998 Entéléchie
 2002 Chaos

Books
2002 L'Oeil Pinéal : Pour Une Cinégraphie, Éd. Paris Expérimental

Footnotes

External links

French classical composers
French male classical composers
French experimental musicians
Musique concrète
French radio presenters
1927 births
2009 deaths
20th-century French male musicians